Peter J. McGuire (July 6, 1852 – February 18, 1906) was an American labor leader of the nineteenth century. He co-founded the United Brotherhood of Carpenters and Joiners of America in 1881 along with Gustav Luebkert and became one of the leading figures in the first three decades of the American Federation of Labor. He is credited with first proposing the idea of Labor Day as a national holiday in 1882.

Early life
Born in New York City into a poor Irish Catholic family, he was a political activist before he became a trade unionist. He became a member in 1873 of a body known as the Committee for Public Safety, which was agitating for unemployment benefits. McGuire was arrested while occupying the office of the city's Police Commissioner, who had refused to grant them a parade permit. Shortly thereafter, he joined with Adolph Strasser, later president of the Cigar Makers' Union, to found the Social Democratic Workingmens Party of North America, a Lassallean socialist organization that proposed to achieve socialism through organization of a socialist party and the organization of trade unions. McGuire founded and edited a paper known as The Toiler, toured the United States lecturing for the party, and worked as a carpenter during the 1870s.

Work
McGuire believed that political organizing held more promise for advancing workers' rights than unionism did during this decade. He became deeply involved in the campaign for the eight-hour day and a member of the Greenback Labor Party after moving in 1878 to St. Louis, Missouri, where he continued to work as a carpenter and joined the Knights of Labor. He led a successful strike of carpenters in St. Louis for the eight-hour day.

With the collapse of the Greenback Labor Party, he became more committed to unionism. As a member of the Knights of Labor who disagreed with some of the labor policies of the Knights of Labor, he supported the creation of a separate labor federation. He attended one of the preliminary meetings that led to the organization of  the Federation of Organized Trades and Labor Unions in 1881. McGuire served as Vice-President of the Federation and its successor, the American Federation of Labor, for most of the following two decades.

In the same year that McGuire called for founding of a national labor federation, he helped organize the convention of various carpenters' unions that formed the United Brotherhood of Carpenters and Joiners of America on August 8, 1881. The organization had a number of goals:  to improve carpenters and working conditions by  protecting the craft from the incursions on their work made by new woodworking machinery that threatened to displace their work of making doors, sashes and other planed elements and to prevent the debasing of their craft by subcontracting, piece rates and other practices that divided the carpenter's work into smaller, less skilled functions. The Carpenters Union proposed to do this by controlling the supply of labor, organizing the entire industry and excluding non-union contractors from the market.

In order to do that, the union first had to either absorb or eliminate rival unions in the industry. This process took two decades to accomplish, as other organizations, such as the United Order of American Carpenters and the Amalgamated Society of Carpenters and Joiners, were just as protective of their jurisdiction. McGuire negotiated reciprocal arrangements with some unions, such as the Amalgamated Society, then later negotiated to absorb it within the Carpenters as a semi-autonomous entity within it. McGuire also negotiated jurisdictional agreements with other unions, such as the Shipwrights Union and the Wood Workers, with competing claims to work that the Carpenters claimed.

McGuire had been not only the only leader that the union had for its first twenty years, but nearly the entire organization for a good part of that time, paying union expenses out of his own pocket. That, along with his conciliatory attitude toward rival unions, gave rise to widespread opposition to his administration at the beginning of the twentieth century. His opponents demanded an audit of the union's records, which showed that approximately ten thousand dollars could not be accounted for. McGuire was arrested for embezzlement in 1901 and voted out of office in 1902.

At the 1902 Carpenters' convention, the last he attended, he addressed the delegates:

[A] man wears out like a piece of machinery. . . . I am not lost entirely in this world but I have had enough to wreck me physically, destroy me mentally.

McGuire died four years later, his death hastened by alcoholism. He is buried in Arlington Cemetery in Pennsauken Township, New Jersey.

Honors
In 2014, McGuire was inducted into the New Jersey Hall of Fame.

In August 2021, a group of rank and file union carpenters in Western Washington organized the Peter J. McGuire Group to push for a better contract and more transparency from the union leadership.

References

External links
 Photo of wreath-laying ceremony honoring McGuire as the "Father of Labor Day"

1852 births
1906 deaths
American socialists
American trade union leaders
American trade unionists of Irish descent
American Roman Catholics
United Brotherhood of Carpenters and Joiners of America people
Trade unionists from New York (state)
Missouri Greenbacks
American Federation of Labor people
Activists from New York City